CNX Resources Corporation is a natural gas company based in Pittsburgh with operations in the Appalachian Basin, primarily in the Marcellus Shale and Utica Shale in Pennsylvania, Ohio and West Virginia. It also develops coalbed methane properties in Virginia along with a methane capture and abatement program. The company also has extensive midstream operations and is one of the largest producers of natural gas in the United States.

History
CNX Resources traces its roots to Consolidation Coal Company, a coal mining company founded in 1860. Dupont and Rheinbraun A.G. formed a joint venture in 1991. In May 1999, the company became a public company via an initial public offering.

In 2010, the company moved its headquarters to Cecil Township, Washington County, Pennsylvania. The company also acquired the natural gas business of Dominion Resources in 2010, which increased its drilling properties and made it one of the largest natural gas production companies in the Marcellus Shale formation.

In 2017, the company completed the corporate spin-off of Consol Energy and changed its name to CNX Resources Corporation. Nicholas (Nick) J. Deiuliis, who was the President and CEO of Consol, continued in those same roles at CNX.

In January 2018, the company purchased a 50% interest in CONE Gathering LLC from Noble Energy. In 2020 CNX acquired all outstanding common shares of  CNX Midstream Partners LP.

The company’s methane abatement program captures methane released from coal and the surrounding rock strata from mining activities. Coalbed methane is a greenhouse gas emitted from both active and closed (or abandoned) underground and surface coal mines that would be emitted to atmosphere if not for capture and abatement programs. To further reduce gas emissions, CNX was the first driller in the Appalachian Basin region to eliminate diesel engines from their hydraulic fracturing fleet and switched to all-electric.

In 2021, the company created the CNX Foundation to administer its $30 million commitment to help those in the Appalachian Basin region achieve economic success. CNX also created a mentorship academy for high schoolers in disadvantaged rural and urban areas. The focus is on exposing students to career opportunities and ensuring they secure a job or apprenticeship by their high school graduation.  Under the program, the students meet once a month, attend field visits with various regional employers, and have on-site visits and guest speakers.  There is also coaching focused on resume creation, job interviews, civics and business, and dressing for success. The Bus Stops Here Foundation and the Builders Guild of Western Pennsylvania are original partners in the program. CNX CEO Nick Deiuliis contributed $1 million of his 2022 compensation to support the academy and proceeds from his book Precipice are also supporting the academy. 

As of July 2022, the CNX Foundation had provided a $1 million grant to bring broadband to Greene County, $400,000 in career training, and $200,000 for technology needs in disadvantaged school districts with the Jerome Bettis Cyber Bus Project. In addition to the Foundation, CNX works with local communities through programs like Domestic Violence Services and Food Helpers.

In May 2022, CNX partnered with the Pittsburgh International Airport (PIT) to produce alternative fuels and electricity from natural gas wells that CNX operates on airport property. PIT sits atop shale formations including the Utica and Marcellus, a natural gas reserve that runs under parts of New York, Pennsylvania, Ohio, West Virginia, Maryland, and Virginia.  CNX will produce compressed natural gas (CNG) onsite to fuel land fleet transportation, and liquefied natural gas (LNG) as an alternative jet fuel.

CNX started partnering with PIT in 2013 and began drilling natural gas wells in 2014. As of 2022, the partnership has supported a 5-generator, 20 MW micro-grid powered by natural gas, and a 3 MW solar array that provides 100% of the airport’s electricity needs.

In July 2022, CNX committed to a 15 year deal with NewLight Technologies to supply methane for the production of biomaterials.

Awards and recognition
In 2020 and 2022, CNX Resources was named to Newsweek's annual "America's Most Responsible Companies" list. In 2021, the company received an ESG Top Performer award from Hart Energy.

CNX also received the Washington County Community Foundation’s Charles C. Keller Excellence Award for Corporate Philanthropy.

See also

 Natural gas in the United States

References

Natural gas companies of the United States
Companies based in Pittsburgh
Companies listed on the New York Stock Exchange
Non-renewable resource companies established in 1860